Tree of Evolution (Turkish: Evrim Ağacı) is an organization founded by the members of METU "Biology and Genetics Club" on November 5, 2010, under the leadership of Çağrı Mert Bakırcı. Among its founders are Babür Erdem and Güngör Budak. In the early stages of the Evolution Tree, METU students and academics played a role in its development. Today, it is a popular science company headquartered in Texas and makes versatile publications for Turkish-speaking people. As of 2020, Ashlee Lane Bakırcı-Taylor and Eyüp Akman are among its managers.

Evolutionagaci.org, which is the official website according to Alexa ranking, is among the most visited websites in Turkey on the internet. His work is periodically supported financially and academically by the European Society for Evolutionary Biology.

Evolution Tree was registered in Turkey on June 1, 2016, by the Turkish Patent and Trademark Office with the trademark number 2015-44893. As of February 23, 2018, it continues to work as the "Tree of Evolution" brand and company in the state of Texas, USA.

History 

The foundations of the Evolution Tree were laid during a METU Biology and Genetics Society (BIYOGEN) weekly meeting held in September 2010. At the meeting, Çağrı Mert Bakırcı, who participated in BYOGEN for the first time, told the chairman of the Board of the period about the idea of establishing a new evolutionary biology formation and received positive feedback. Upon this positive feedback, it was decided to implement the project in a short time and people who might want to be particularly interested in the Theory of Evolution met with Bakırcı. Bakırcı, who met Babür Erdem and Güngör Budak in this process, drew a broad road map in a short time and brainstormed with other possible members of the team, and took the necessary decisions regarding the vision, mission, content, and plans of the organization. The "Tree of Evolution", which will be the name of the group that decided to move forward as a science and enlightenment movement, was recommended by Erdem after a few days of reflection and discussion and was accepted in a short time. Thereupon, the Tree of Evolution was officially established on November 5, 2010, in METU, Ankara, with its first meeting under the leadership of Bakırcı. The team started broadcasting with the Facebook page it created when Facebook was first established. It started to be supported financially and academically for the first time by the European Society for Evolutionary Biology (ESEB) on April 4, 2012. The team opened its official website under the name Evrimagaci.org on 11 December 2012. Since then, the entire database of the Evolution Tree has been stored on the official website and officially published on social media accounts such as Facebook, Twitter, and Instagram. The logo of Evolution Tree was designed by Serhat Seykan on February 16, 2015.

School 
In postgraduate research and theses conducted at various universities such as Istanbul University, Atatürk University and Yıldız Technical University, the Tree of Evolution has been examined as a school for science narrating via the internet and social media.

Criticism 
Their stance on vegetarianism and veganism has been criticized by vegan organizations.

References 

Think tanks based in Turkey